Season 2011–12 sees Greenock Morton compete in their fifth consecutive season in the First Division, having finished 7th in the 2010–11 season.

Story of the season

May

Top league goal scorer Allan Jenkins rejected a new deal at the club, and will join a new club on 15 May. It turned out that he was offered more money to go to Northern Ireland and sign for part-timers Ballymena United.

Brian Graham, Ryan Kane and Nathan Shepherd were all released.

Grant Evans signed a one-year permanent deal after his loan deal expired.

Ross Forsyth became Morton's second signing of the season, coming in on a free transfer from Stirling Albion, on a part-time basis.

Allan Moore confirmed pre-contract agreements with another two ex-Stirling players in Paul di Giacomo and Andy Graham, they completed the deals in June 2011.

Carlo Monti turned down a new contract offer with the club.

A slight variation on the strip sponsor was announced for the new season, with Golden Casket maintaining their place as sponsors, but replacing the Millions brand with Ferguson's Chocolate.

Kevin Kelbie was allowed to leave six months early to join Jenkins in Northern Ireland, signing for Glenavon.

June

Morton sign St Johnstone striker Andy Jackson on a free transfer, with Queen of the South midfielder Stephen McKenna expected to sign shortly. McKenna however rejected a move to Cappielow, preferring to stay at the Doonhamers.

Fouad Bachirou signed a new one-year deal, and loanee from last season Sean Fitzharris returned to the club after being released by Celtic.

Morton hired renowned sports scientist Graeme Jones, to improve the squad's fitness over the pre-season program.

A few unattached players took part in the first day of pre-season training, including Archie Campbell, Peter MacDonald and Darren McGeouch (who previously played for the club). Gavin Skelton was also spoken to regarding a possible move to Cappielow, and came into the training ground for a trial. Skelton signed for English non-league side Barrow after being offered a bumper contract; a major coup for the Bluebirds.

Trialists McGeouch and MacDonald scored in closed doors games against Airdrie United and Hibernian respectively.

July

Morton sign two youngsters, Creag Little and Conor Ramsay, from rivals St Mirren on free transfers.

Three more trialists signed up on one-year deals, Darren McGeouch, Peter MacDonald and Archie Campbell.

Morton lost 3–2 at home to Motherwell, with the afore-mentioned players all taking part, as well as trialists Josh Knight (Port Talbot Town) and Florian Verplanck (Beauvais).

Morton lost in the Renfrewshire Cup final for the sixth season in succession. This time, a 4–2 defeat with Peter Weatherson scoring two late consolations.

Morton recovered from this derby defeat by hammering Stranraer 8–0 in the Challenge Cup first round, and defeating Alloa Athletic in the League Cup.

August
Morton were drawn against rivals St Mirren in the League Cup, the first competitive meeting between the pair since in the Challenge Cup in 2005. Saints won the match 3–4, coming back from a 2–1 deficit at the break.

Ayr United agreed a deal to play their Challenge Cup tie against Raith Rovers at Cappielow.

Morton signed Reece McGillion from Hamilton Accies (for the U19 side). The youngster had previously featured Sky1 TV show Football's Next Star where he finished 7th.

Kevin McCann signed on a short-term deal from Hibs.

September

Allan Moore received the Manager of the Month award for August, for taking the side to second place, tied on points with league favourites Hamilton Accies.

Morton defeated Ayr United to go top of the First Division.

Matthew McGinley was signed as a back-up to Colin Stewart, from junior side Rutherglen Glencairn.

On 24 September, captain Stuart McCaffrey tore his left plantar fascia in a match against Falkirk. This after months of treatment, eventually ruled him out for the entire season.

October
Youth director John Laird resigned from the club, citing "family reasons and additional business interests".

With a lack of fit midfielders available to him, Allan Moore attempted to bring in Derek Young as cover until January, awaiting international clearance from the Icelandic FA.

Morton were drawn at home to conquerors of Berwick Rangers, Highland Football League side Deveronvale in the third round of the Scottish Cup. The tie to be played on 19 November 2011 at Cappielow.

November
Moore completed the signing of Derek Young, and added the loan signing of Dominic Cervi from Celtic, after chairman Douglas Rae put up the additional funds to cover their wages.

Morton's groundsman, Mark Farrell, was named as having the best pitch in the First Division by the Institute of Groundsmanship.

Deveronvale were dispatched 5–1 as Morton moved into the Fourth Round of the Scottish Cup. Morton were drawn away to Raith Rovers in the fourth round.

December
Morton took former Spain U21 Jorge Larena and current Finland U21 international Tuomas Rannankari on trial. Larena eventually signed for Huesca.

Moore confirmed that Dominic Cervi would return to Celtic in January, and that it would be difficult to bring in Rannankari as he was still contracted to Twente.

January
Derek Young was offered a new contract, but Dominic Cervi returned to Celtic after his loan spell and Kevin McCann was allowed to leave after his contract expired.

Graham Gartland was rumoured to be in signing talks with the club, from St Johnstone. This was repudiated by the club, as they announced that Young had signed his contract extension. Gartland in the end signed for Shamrock Rovers back in his hometown of Dublin.

Morton traversed the challenge of Raith Rovers in Kirkcaldy to progress to the Fifth Round of the Scottish Cup with a comeback to win 2–1. After the draw for the next round was made by André Villas-Boas and Marcello Lippi, Morton were drawn away to Motherwell in the Fifth Round. Prices were confirmed as being £15 for adults, the same as a First Division game at Cappielow, so a considerable discount from Motherwell's usual SPL prices.

Tied top scorer (with 12 goals at the time) Andy Jackson suffered a hairline fracture to his jaw, ruling him out for four to six weeks.

Morton legend Warren Hawke returned to the club to oversee the youth development at their youth academy.

After the news that McCaffrey's season was over Michael Tidser was named as the team captain at the age of 22.

Towards the end of the transfer window, Sean Fitzharris was released from the club.

Thomas O'Ware suffered a stress fracture to his tibia, ruling him out for at least a month.

February
Morton were trounced 6–0 by Motherwell to eliminate them from the Scottish Cup.

March
Derek Anderson was appointed as director of Morton's youth academy.

Morton signed Scotland B international Alan Combe to replace Colin Stewart.

Jonatan Johansson became the new youth coach to work under Derek Anderson and Warren Hawke.

Iain Flannigan signed until the end of the season; plus Creag Little and Alistair Deans were loaned out to junior clubs.

April
Stuart McCaffrey announced that due to his injury he would be taking time out from football, but not announcing his retirement at this stage.

Morton found out that their opponents in the semi-final of the Renfrewshire Cup would be Gourock Thistle, to be play on 2 May 2012.

Despite only signing a few weeks earlier, Iain Flannigan broke his arm and would miss the remainder of the season.

May
Paul di Giacomo confirmed that he would be leaving the club at the end of the season to find a job and turn part-time.

Morton defeated Gourock Thistle in their Renfrewshire Cup semi-final by three goals to one; goals came from U17 midfielder Alan Frizzell, a header by young striker Lewis Hawke and a free kick by Peter Weatherson.

Morton finished the season in the 8th position, after a 3–1 home defeat to Raith Rovers.

First team transfers
From end of 2009–10 season, to last match of season 2010–11
Including unsigned trialists who appeared in first team matchday squads

In

Out

Squad (that played for first team)

Fixtures and results

Friendlies

Scottish Football League First Division

If in bold, Morton were top of the league after this game.
Links to BBC match reports next to scores. Alternatives given if BBC report not available.

Scottish Cup

Scottish League Cup

Challenge Cup

League table

Player statistics

All competitions
Additional positions played listed, if have started in more than one this season, after most played position.

Awards

Last updated 21 December 2011

References

See also 

Greenock Morton F.C. seasons
Greenock Morton